Cantharellus flavus is a species of fungus in the genus Cantharellus. Found in North America, it was described in 2013.

References

External links
 

flavus
Fungi described in 2013
Fungi of North America
Edible fungi